Pseudostenophylax sparsus is a species of northern caddisfly in the family Limnephilidae. It is found in North America.

Subspecies
These two subspecies belong to the species Pseudostenophylax sparsus:
 Pseudostenophylax sparsus sparsus
 Pseudostenophylax sparsus uniformis (Betten, 1934)

References

Integripalpia
Articles created by Qbugbot
Insects described in 1908